Reading 2100 is the prototype of the class "T-1" 4-8-4 "Northern" type steam locomotives constructed in 1945 for use by the Reading Company. Constructed from an earlier 2-8-0 "Consolidation" type locomotive built in 1923, No. 2100 handled heavy coal train traffic for the Reading until being retired from revenue service in 1956. Between 1959 and 1964, No. 2100 was used to pull the famed Iron Horse Rambles excursions alongside sister engine 2124, and later, 2102. After the rambles ended, 2100 was sold along with 2101 to a scrapyard Baltimore, Maryland in 1967, and it was stored there, until it was sold to Ross Rowland in 1975. It subsequently went through several ownership changes and spent more time in storage or being towed than it did operating under its own power. In 1998, it was sold to Thomas Payne, who moved it to St. Thomas, Ontario in Canada and modified it to burn oil. It eventually made its way to the Golden Pacific Railroad in Tacoma, Washington to pull tourist trains for one year, before it sat idle in Richland. In 2015, the American Steam Railroad Preservation Association acquired 2100 and moved it to their roundhouse in Cleveland, Ohio. They are rebuilding 2100 back to service as a coal burner, as of 2023.

History

Revenue service 
No. 2100 was originally constructed by the Baldwin Locomotive Works in Philadelphia, Pennsylvania in 1923 as an I10sa class 2-8-0 "Consolidation" type locomotive, and it was originally numbered 2045. The Reading Company initially assigned to pull heavy freight trains on the Reading's Branch lines, and sometimes, on the Main line. In September 1945, No. 2045 became the very first I10sa to be moved inside the Reading's own locomotive shops in Reading to be rebuilt into their new T-1 class 4-8-4 "Northerns", and it was renumbered to 2100. Subsequently, it pulled heavy coal trains across the Reading's mainline, until being retired from revenue service in 1956.

Between 1959 and 1964, No. 2100 was used to pull the famed Iron Horse Rambles excursions alongside sister engine 2124, and later, 2102. After the rambles ended, 2100 was sold along with 2101 to Streigel Equipment and Supply of Baltimore, Maryland in September 1967, and spent almost a decade in the firm's scrapyard until 1975. That year, it was purchased along with No. 2101 by Ross Rowland to be used as a source of spare parts for the former for his American Freedom Train.

Excursion service 
After No. 2101 was damaged in a fire in 1979, No. 2100 swapped tenders with its sister and was stored in the former Western Maryland roundhouse in Hagerstown, Maryland until 1988. A non-profit group called the 2100 corporation, which was led by Rowland, Bill Benson, and owner and CEO of Lionel trains Richard Kughn, worked to restore 2100 to operating condition. They only used No. 2100 to run on the Winchester and Western Railroad before it was eventually donated to the Portage Area Regional Transportation Authority, who in turn put it up for auction. During this time in the early 1990s, it was stored at the Wheeling & Lake Erie Railroad shops in Brewster, OH. Later, Jerry Jacobson, who briefly stored and test ran it on his Ohio Central Railroad, placed a bid on the locomotive to regularly use it for his own excursion trains, but he lost the bid in 1998 to Thomas Payne. Payne moved No. 2100 to the former New York Central's St. Thomas, Ontario shop, where it was converted to burn oil, with plans to use the locomotive to pull excursions throughout the Rocky Mountains on his own Central Western Railroad. These plans never came to fruition, and in 2007, No. 2100 was moved to Tacoma, Washington where it briefly ran on the Golden Pacific Railroad's Tacoma Sightseer trains over former Milwaukee Road trackage until 2008, when it was placed in outdoor storage in Richland, Washington.

Restoration 
In 2015, it was leased to the American Steam Railroad Preservation Association and moved to the former Baltimore and Ohio roundhouse in Cleveland, Ohio where it is presently being restored to operating condition alongside the Midwest Railway Preservation Society's Grand Trunk Western 2-8-2 4070. As of 2023, No. 2100 is still being restored to operation with plans to revert it back to its freight livery.

See also 

 Reading 1187
 Reading 1251
 Grand Trunk Western 6325
 Canadian National 6060
 Spokane, Portland and Seattle 700

References

External links 
 Reading 2100

Baldwin locomotives
2100
Railway locomotives introduced in 1925
4-8-4 locomotives
Philadelphia and Reading Railroad locomotives
Standard gauge locomotives of the United States
Preserved steam locomotives of Ohio
Freight locomotives
Individual locomotives of the United States